The Workers World Party (WWP) is a revolutionary Marxist–Leninist communist party founded in 1959 by a group led by Sam Marcy of the Socialist Workers Party (SWP). Marcy and his followers split from the SWP in 1958 over a series of long-standing differences, among them their support for Henry A. Wallace's Progressive Party in 1948, their view of People's Republic of China as a workers' state, and their defense of the 1956 Soviet intervention in Hungary, some of which the SWP opposed.

The WWP describes itself as a party that has since its founding "supported the struggles of all oppressed peoples". It has recognized the right of nations to self-determination, including the nationally oppressed peoples inside the United States. It supports affirmative action as necessary in the fight for equality and it opposes all forms of racism and religious bigotry. The WWP and its affiliate Youth Against War and Fascism (YAWF) were known for their consistent defense of the Black Panthers, the Weather Underground, the Vietnam Veterans Against the War and the Puerto Rican Independence movement. The WWP was also an early advocate of gay rights and remains active in this area. The WWP has published Workers World since 1959. The newspaper has been a weekly since 1974.

History 

The WWP had its origins in the Global Class War Tendency, led by Sam Marcy and Vincent Copeland, within the SWP. This group crystallized during the 1948 presidential election when they urged the SWP to back Henry Wallace's Progressive Party campaign, rather than field their own candidates. Throughout the 1950s, the Global Class War Tendency expressed positions at odds with official SWP policy, categorizing the Korean War as a class, rather than imperialist, conflict; support of the People's Republic of China as a workers' state, if not necessarily supporting the Mao Zedong leadership; and supporting the suppression of the Hungarian Revolution by the Soviet Union in 1956.

The Global Class War Tendency left the SWP in early 1959. Although they would later abandon Trotskyism, in their International Workers Day issue (no. 3) of their new periodical the group proclaimed: "We are THE Trotskyists. We stand 100% with all the principled positions of Leon Trotsky, the most revolutionary communist since Lenin". The nascent group appears to have organized as the Workers World Party by February 1960. At its inception, the WWP was concentrated among the working class in Buffalo, Youngstown, Seattle and New York. A youth organization, first known as the Anti-Fascist Youth Committee and later as Youth Against War and Fascism (YAWF), was created in April 1962.

From the beginning, the WWP and YAWF concentrated their energies on street demonstrations. Early campaigns focused on support of Patrice Lumumba, opposition to the House Un-American Activities Committee and against racial discrimination in housing. They conducted the first protest against American involvement in Vietnam on August 2, 1962. Their opposition to the war also included the tactics of "draft resistance" and "GI resistance". After organizing demonstrations at Fort Sill, Oklahoma in support of a soldier being tried for possessing anti-war literature, they founded the American Servicemen's Union, intended to be a mass organization of American soldiers. However, the group was completely dominated by the WWP and YAWF.

During the late 1960s and 1970s, the party was involved in protests other causes, including "defen[se] of the heroic black uprisings in Watts, Newark, Detroit, Harlem" and women's liberation. During the Attica Prison riot, the rioters requested YAWF member Tom Soto to present their grievances for them. The WWP was most successful in organizing demonstrations in support of desegregation "busing" in the Boston schools in 1975. Nearly 30,000 people attended the Boston March Against Racism which they had organized. During the 1970s, they also attempted to begin work inside organized labor, but apparently were not very successful.

In 1980, the WWP began to participate in electoral politics, naming a presidential ticket as well as candidates for New York Senate, congressional and state legislature seats. In California, they ran their candidate Deirdre Griswold in the primary for the Peace and Freedom Party nomination. They came in last with 1,232 votes out of 9,092. In 1984, the WWP supported Jesse Jackson's bid for the Democratic nomination, but when he lost in the primaries they nominated their own presidential ticket, along with a handful of congressional and legislative nominees.

Activities and organizational structure 

The WWP has organized, directed or participated in many coalition organizations for various causes, typically anti-imperialist in nature. The International Action Center, which counts many WWP members as leading activists, founded the Act Now to Stop War and End Racism (ANSWER) coalition shortly after the September 11 attacks in 2001 and has run both the All People's Congress (APC) and the International Action Center (IAC) for many years. The APC and the IAC in particular share a large degree of overlap in their memberships with cadre in the WWP. In 2004, a youth group close to the WWP called Fight Imperialism Stand Together (FIST) was founded.

The WWP has participated in presidential election campaigns since the 1980 election, though its effectiveness in this area is limited as it has not been able to get on the ballots of many states. The party also has run some campaigns for other offices. One of the most successful was in 1990, when Susan Farquhar got on the ballot as a Senate candidate in Michigan and received 1.3% of the vote. However, the party's best result was in the 1992 Ohio Senate election, when the WWP candidate received 6.7% of the vote, running against a Democrat and a Republican.

North Korea 
The WWP has maintained a position of supporting the government of North Korea. Through its Vietnam-era front organization, the American Servicemen's Union (ASU), the party endorsed a 1971 statement of support for that government. The statement was read on North Korea's international radio station by visiting ASU delegate Andy Stapp. In 1994, Sam Marcy sent a letter to Kim Jong-il expressing his condolences on behalf of the WWP on the death of his father Kim Il-sung, calling him a great leader and comrade in the international communist movement. Its later front groups, IAC and formerly International A.N.S.W.E.R., have also demonstrated in support of North Korea.

Iraq 
When the WWP was playing a role in organizing anti-war protests before the invasion of Iraq in 2003, many newspapers and TV shows attacked the WWP specifically for supporting the Iraqi dictator Saddam Hussein.

Belarus 
The WWP signalized support of Alexander Lukashenko during the Belarusian protests in 2020. They accused the protest movement of being "counterrevolutionary" and supported by the "fascist Maidan movement and the U.S. imperialism", while praising President Lukashenko for maintaining some socialist-oriented politics, rejection of privatization and keeping the Soviet state symbolic.

Splits 

In 1968, the WWP absorbed a small faction of the Spartacist League that had worked with it in the Coalition for an Anti-Imperialist Movement called the Revolutionary Communist League (Internationalist). This group left the WWP in 1971 as the New York Revolutionary Committee. The NYRC's newspaper provided rare details about the internal functioning of the group that have subsequently been used by scholars as a primary source. The NYRC later reconstituted as the Revolutionary Communist League (Internationalist).

In 2004, the WWP suffered its most serious split when the San Francisco branch and some other members left to form the Party for Socialism and Liberation.

In July 2018, the WWP experienced another schism in which one of its oldest branches, the Detroit branch, resigned from the organization along with several other branches to form the Communist Workers League.

Presidential tickets

Notable members 
 Vince Copeland, actor
 Leslie Feinberg, author
 Sara Flounders, activist
 Sam Marcy, author

References

Sources

Further reading 
 Ken Lawrence (January 1999). "Roots of the Workers World Party". Marxmail Discussion List.
 "Politics 1 Guide to US Political parties". It contains brief entry on WWP.
 "A Clarification on Sam Marcy and Henry Wallace". A correspondence on the early history of the Global Class War tendency.
 Kevin Coogan. Peace Activists' with a Secret Agenda Part Three: Stealth Trotskyism and the Mystery of the WWP".

External links 

 Sam Marcy (1979). The Global Class War and the Destiny of American Labor. New Haven, Connecticut: Revolutionary Communist League (Internationalist). A foundational document of the Global Class War tendency.
 V. Grey New York (November 3, 1956). The Class Character of the Hungarian Uprising: Proposed Resolution on the Class Character of the Hungarian Uprising. Reissued by Workers World in 1959. Another foundational document of the Global Class War tendency.

 
Communist parties in the United States
Far-left politics in the United States
1959 establishments in the United States
Political parties in the United States
Anti-Zionism in the United States